Polk Township District No. 2 School, also known as the Barber School, is a historic one-room school located in Polk Township, Marshall County, Indiana. It was built about 1901, and is a one-story, "T"-plan brick building with Queen Anne style detailing.  The building consists of front cloak room section with a single large classroom.  Both sections have high pitched gable roofs.  The building features patterned brick details and rafter tails with cut scroll designs.  The school closed in 1925, with local school consolidation.

It was listed on the National Register of Historic Places in 2013.

References

One-room schoolhouses in Indiana
School buildings on the National Register of Historic Places in Indiana
Queen Anne architecture in Indiana
School buildings completed in 1901
Buildings and structures in Marshall County, Indiana
National Register of Historic Places in Marshall County, Indiana
1901 establishments in Indiana